John Towner (born 19 November 1933) is a former Australian rules footballer who played 87 senior games for the Essendon Football Club from 1953 to 1959.

Career 
Recruited from the Ascot Vale Football Club, Towner made his debut for Essendon Firsts as a reserve in the second home-and-away round match against South Melbourne at the Lake Oval on 2 May 1953. In his first year, he played 11 senior matches, including the Firsts Semi-Final team that lost 5.11 (41) to Footscray's 6.13 (49).

He played 16 senior games in 1954, a single game in 1955, 10 games in 1956 (plus 1 night game), 16 games in 1957 (plus 1 night game) — he played on the half-back flank in the losing Essendon Grand Final team of 1957 — 16 games in 1958 (plus 2 night games), and 17 games in 1959.

His game at full-back for the Essendon 1959 Grand Final team, which was beaten by Melbourne 17.13 (115) to 11.12 (78), was his last game for Essendon.

Well-liked at Essendon (he was chosen as Best Clubman in 1957 and 1959), he left Essendon due to an employment transfer to Western Australia.

He played at full-back with West Perth for three years (1960–1962).

He later moved to Queensland and was captain-coach of Surfers Paradise Football Club in 1965.

Forward to back-line 
In 1953 and 1954 Towner played on the forward line. With a lot of pace across the ground, and strong in the air, he was tried at full-forward as a replacement for the injured John Coleman in 1954; however, once at full-forward, he demonstrated that he was not a very accurate kick (he kicked 23 goals in 9 matches).

Once he was switched to defence, he was highly successful, initially on the half-back flank and, later in his career at Essendon, as the team's regular full-back.

As a full-back, much of his game was centred on his ability to judge and understand the manner in which his full-forward opponent went for the ball; and much of his value to Essendon was his ability to consistently punch the ball out of the hands of a full-forward attempting to mark over his head.

In particular, he always had "the wood" over South Melbourne's Brownlow Medallist Fred Goldsmith, holding him goal-less on several occasions; and it was enthralling as a spectator, to see the tussle between the two — in particular, to see the highly skilled full-back-turned-full-forward Goldsmith getting more and more frustrated each time that the fist of the highly skilled full-forward-turned-full-back Towner came between his own outstretched hands and, yet again, punched the ball 20 metres towards the Essendon goals.

Notes

References
 Maplestone, M., Flying Higher: History of the Essendon Football Club 1872-1996, Essendon Football Club, (Melbourne), 1996. 
 Ross, J. (ed), 100 Years of Australian Football 1897-1996: The Complete Story of the AFL, All the Big Stories, All the Great Pictures, All the Champions, Every AFL Season Reported, Viking, (Ringwood), 1996.

External links

1933 births
Australian rules footballers from Victoria (Australia)
Essendon Football Club players
West Perth Football Club players
Living people